Robert Bakewell (10 March 1767 – 15 August 1843) was an English geologist.

Life
Bakewell was born in Nottingham in 1767. He was an able observer, and deserving of mention as one of the earliest teachers of general and practical geology. From 1811 onwards, he lectured on geology all over the country, exhibiting sections of rock formation and a geological map, the first of its kind.

His Introduction to Geology (1813) contained much sound information, and reached a fifth edition in 1838. The second edition was translated and published in Germany, and the third and fourth editions were reprinted in America by Professor Silliman of Yale College. 
He died at Hampstead on 15 August 1843.

Works
Introduction to Geology (1813 / 1815 / 1833 / 1838) 
 Introduction to Mineralogy (1819)
 Travels comprising Observations made during a Residence in the Tarentaise, &c. (2 vols., 1823).
 Suggestions Relative to the Philosophy of Geology, as Deduced from the Facts (1839, online)

For Rees's Cyclopædia he contributed articles on Geology, Mineralogy, Rock, Strata, Wool and Worsted.

References

Attribution
 
 ; Endnotes:
Poggendorff's Biographisch – litterarisches Handwörterbuch 
Donaldson's Agricultural Dictionary

External links
 

1767 births
1843 deaths
English geologists
Scientists from Nottingham